Ngan Kwoon Yat Kevin (born 18 October 1983) is a fencer from Hong Kong, China who won a bronze medal at both the 2006 Asian Games and the 2010 Asian Games in the men's foil team competition.

References

Living people
1983 births
Hong Kong male foil fencers
Place of birth missing (living people)
Asian Games medalists in fencing
Fencers at the 2006 Asian Games
Fencers at the 2010 Asian Games
Asian Games bronze medalists for Hong Kong
Medalists at the 2006 Asian Games
Medalists at the 2010 Asian Games